Pete Seeger: The Power of Song (2007) is a documentary film about the life and music of the folk singer Pete Seeger. The film, which won an Emmy Award, was executive produced by Seeger's wife, filmmaker Toshi Seeger, when she was 85 years old.

The documentary was directed by Jim Brown, who also directed The Weavers: Wasn't That a Time! (1982). The film includes interviews with Arlo Guthrie, Bruce Springsteen, Bob Dylan, Joan Baez, Tom Paxton, Mary Travers (of Peter, Paul and Mary), Natalie Maines, and numerous Seeger family members. One of its associate producers was Kitama Jackson, a grandson of Seeger.

References

External links
 Full Film: Pete Seeger: The Power of Song at American Masters
Pete Seeger: The Power of Song - PBS website containing additional material and background information
 

Documentary films about singers
2007 documentary films
Pete Seeger
2007 television films
2007 films
American Masters films
Films directed by Jim Brown
Films about activists
2000s American films